Jan Erik Rekdal (born 10 February 1951) is a Norwegian philologist and poet.

He has issued such poetry collections as Vandring på verdens vestkyst (1975), Linedanseren (1976), Sentrum i periferien (1978), Oppstandelse nærvær (1985), I Rumis skygge (1997) and Hotellvertens bedrøvelse og andre samtaler (2007).

Rekdal is a professor of Celtic languages and Irish literature at the University of Oslo. He is a member of the Norwegian Academy of Science and Letters.

References

1951 births
Living people
Norwegian poets
Norwegian philologists
Academic staff of the University of Oslo
Members of the Norwegian Academy of Science and Letters